(July 28, 1944 – March 14, 2017) was a Japanese actor known for portraying Rintaro Kano in Keishicho Sosa Ikka 9 Gakari ("Homicide Team 9"). He won the award for best supporting actor at the 2nd Japan Academy Prize for The Incident and at the 3rd Hochi Film Award for The Incident, Kōtei no inai hachigatsu and The Fall of Ako Castle. His older brother is the actor Tetsuya Watari.

Death
Tsunehiko Watase died at a hospital in Tokyo on Tuesday, his office said Thursday. He was 72.

Watase had been undergoing treatment after a tumor was found in his gallbladder in 2015. He died of multiple organ failure, his office said.

Filmography

Film
 Sympathy for the Underdog (1971)
 Wandering Ginza Butterfly
(1972)
 Battles Without Honor and Humanity (1973)
 Battles Without Honor and Humanity: Proxy War (1973)
 Bodigaado Kiba: Hissatsu sankaku tobi (1973)
Aesthetics of a Bullet (1973)
 New Battles Without Honor and Humanity (1974)
 New Battles Without Honor and Humanity: The Boss's Head (1975)
 Violent Panic: The Big Crash (1976)
 Legend of Dinosaurs & Monster Birds (1977)
 The Fall of Ako Castle (1978)
 The Incident (1978)
 Kōtei no inai hachigatsu (1978)
 Heaven Sent (1979)
 G.I. Samurai (1979)
 Virus (1980)
 Sailor Suit and Machine Gun (1981)
 The Gate of Youth (1981)
 Dotonbori River (1982)
 Nankyoku Monogatari (1983)
 Heaven and Earth (1990)
 Crest of Betrayal (1994)
 Tokyo Blackout (1987)
 Toki o Kakeru Shōjo (1997)
 Andromedia (1998)

Television
 Oshin (1983-1984)
 Sanada Taiheiki (1985-1986) - Sanada Nobuyuki
 Inspector Totsugawa Series (1992-2015) - Inspector Totsugawa
 Taxi Driver's Mystery Diary (1992-2016) - Yoake
 Homura Tatsu (1993-1994) - Fujiwara no Hidehira
 Musashi (2003)
 Keishicho Sosa Ikka 9 Gakari (2005-2017) - Rintaro Kano 
 Omiya-san (2008-2009)

References

External links
 

1944 births
2017 deaths
Japanese male television actors
People from Shimane Prefecture
Japanese male film actors
20th-century Japanese male actors
21st-century Japanese male actors